Howard Unwin Moffat  (13 January 1869 – 19 January 1951) served as second premier of Southern Rhodesia, from 1927 to 1933.

Early life
Born in the Kuruman mission station in Bechuanaland (now in the Northern Cape province of South Africa), Moffat was the son of the missionary John Smith Moffat and grandson of the missionary Robert Moffat, who was the friend of King Mzilikazi and the father-in-law of David Livingstone. Howard Moffat attended St. Andrew's College, Grahamstown in 1885.

After service in the Bechuanaland Border Police, Moffat moved to Bulawayo and served in the 1893 Matabele War and the Anglo-Boer War.

Political career
He was elected to the Legislative Council in 1923 as member for Victoria and served as Minister of Mines and Works under Charles Coghlan. In the 1927 Birthday Honours Moffat was made a Companion of the Order of St Michael and St George (CMG). He succeeded as premier after Coghlan's death in September 1927.

Moffat was viewed as a conservative who believed that Rhodesia would eventually join the Union of South Africa. He oversaw the purchase, for £2 million, of the British South Africa Company's remaining mineral rights in Southern Rhodesia. His government passed the 1930 Land Apportionment Act, which defined the pattern of land allocation and ownership and is viewed as being one of the ultimate causes of the land disputes during land reform in Zimbabwe from 2000. He resigned in 1933 and was succeeded by George Mitchell. In the 1933 general election he lost his seat. On 6 July 1933 he was granted retention of The Honourable for life.

Later life
In the 1939 general election Moffat attempted to restart the Rhodesia Party but this met with failure.

References

 
Bridger, P., House, M., and others, 1973. Encyclopaedia Rhodesia, College Press, Salisbury, Rhodesia.

1869 births
1951 deaths
People from John Taolo Gaetsewe District Municipality
British colonial police officers
British military personnel of the Second Boer War
Rhodesian Congregationalists
Prime Ministers of Rhodesia
Members of the Legislative Assembly of Southern Rhodesia
Companions of the Order of St Michael and St George
Alumni of St. Andrew's College, Grahamstown